The I Constitutional Government of Portugal had Mário Soares as the Prime-Minister and lasted from 1976 to 1978.

References

1976 establishments in Portugal
1978 disestablishments in Portugal
Cabinets established in 1976
Cabinets disestablished in 1978
Constitutional Governments of Portugal